Erika Fairweather (born 31 December 2003) is a New Zealand swimmer who competed at the 2019 World Aquatics Championships and the 2020 Summer Olympics.

Fairweather was born in Dunedin, She is of mixed European and Māori descent, affiliating with Ngāi Tahu iwi. She attended Kavanagh College and was head girl in 2021.

In 2018 she competed at both the 2018 Summer Youth Olympics and the 2018 Junior Pan Pacific Games. In August 2019, Fairweather won the gold medal in the 200 metres freestyle at the World Junior Swimming Championships in Budapest, Hungary, breaking her own New Zealand age-group record with a time of 1:57.96. She finished fourth in the final of the 400 metres, again breaking her own national age-group record with a time of 4:08.78.

At the 2020 Tokyo Olympics, Fairweather finished second in her heat of the 400 metres freestyle, breaking the New Zealand record (set by Lauren Boyle in 2012), with a time of 4:02.28.

References

External links
 

2003 births
Living people
New Zealand female swimmers
Swimmers at the 2018 Summer Youth Olympics
Sportspeople from Dunedin
Swimmers at the 2020 Summer Olympics
Olympic swimmers of New Zealand
21st-century New Zealand women
People educated at Trinity Catholic College, Dunedin
Swimmers at the 2022 Commonwealth Games
Commonwealth Games competitors for New Zealand
Medalists at the FINA World Swimming Championships (25 m)